Nenjirukkum Varai may refer to:

 Nenjirukkum Varai (1967 film), a Tamil-language film directed by C. V. Sridhar, starring Sivaji Ganesan and K. R. Vijaya
 Nenjirukkum Varai (2006 film), a Tamil-language film directed by S. A. Chandrasekhar, starring Narain and Deepa